Crocus laevigatus, the smooth crocus, is a species of flowering plant in the genus Crocus of the family Iridaceae, endemic to Crete, Greece.

It has gained the Royal Horticultural Society's Award of Garden Merit.  

The Latin specific epithet laevigatus means "smooth".

References

laevigatus
Plants described in 1832
Taxa named by Louis Athanase Chaubard